The Battle of Doljești was fought on 12 April 1457 and the Battle of Orbic was fought on 14 April 1457 between the forces of Ştefan cel Mare and the forces of Petru Aron. Ştefan cel Mare was aided by the Wallachians under Vlad Dracula meanwhile Petru Aron's forces were aided by the Ottomans under Mehmed II. Ştefan's forces were victorious, and he was made Stephen the Great of Moldavia.

Doljești and Orbic
1457 in Europe
Conflicts in 1457
Stephen the Great